The 13th Lo Nuestro Awards ceremony, presented by Univision to honor the best Latin music of 2000 and 2001, took place on February 8, 2001, at a live presentation held at the James L. Knight Center in Miami, Florida. The ceremony was broadcast in the United States and Latin America by Univision.

During the ceremony, twenty-nine categories were presented. Winners were announced at the live event and included Puerto-Rican American band Son by Four receiving six competitive awards. Mexican singer-songwriter Joan Sebastian earned three accolades and the Excellence Award; and Mexican singer Pepe Aguilar, American singer Christina Aguilera and Colombian performer Shakira earned two awards each. The 13th Lo Nuestro Awards were the first to be held since the inception of the Latin Grammy Awards.

Background 
In 1989, the Lo Nuestro Awards were established by Univision, to recognize the most talented performers of Latin music. The nominees and winners were selected by a voting poll conducted among program directors of Spanish-language radio stations in the United States and the results were tabulated and certified by the accounting firm Arthur Andersen. The trophy awarded is shaped like a treble clef. The 13th Lo Nuestro Awards ceremony was held on February 8, 2001, in a live presentation held at the James L. Knight Center in Miami, Florida. The ceremony was broadcast in the United States and Latin America by Univision. The categories included were for the Pop, Tropical/Salsa, Regional Mexican and Music Video fields before the 2000 awards, from 2001 onwards categories were expanded and included a Rock field; for the Regional Mexican genre a Ranchera, Grupero, Tejano and Norteño fields were added; and Traditional, Merengue and Salsa performances were also considered in the Tropical/Salsa field. Before the Latin Grammy Awards inception, the Lo Nuestro Awards were considered as the Grammy Award equivalent for Latin music. Therefore, the Lo Nuestro ceremony was advanced from May to February since the 1st Latin Grammy Awards were held in September, 2000.

Nominees and winners 

Winners were announced before the live audience during the ceremony. Puerto Rican American band Son by Four were the most nominated performers and won their six nominations, including Pop and Tropical/Salsa Song of the Year for their single "A Puro Dolor". The song spent 20 weeks at number-one in the Billboard Top Latin Songs and is the longest-running single in the history of the chart with 61 weeks. Mexican singer Paulina Rubio was awarded for Pop Album of the Year with Paulina, the best-selling Latin album in the United States in 2001. At the newly introduced rock categories, Colombian singer-songwriter Shakira won her two nominations, Artist and Album of the Year for MTV Unplugged, which also won the Grammy Award for Best Latin Pop Album.

Mexican performer Joan Sebastian dominated the Regional/Mexican field winning Album (Secreto de Amor), Song ("Secreto de Amor"), and Grupero Performance. Sebastian also received the Excellence Award. Fellow Mexican singer Thalía was honored with the "Premio del Pueblo" (Viewers Choice) in the pop field, while Puerto-Rican American Elvis Crespo earned the same distinction for the Tropical field, and singer-songwriter Pepe Aguilar received the same accolade for the Regional/Mexican field. Aguilar also won for Ranchero Performance and Regional/Mexican Male Artist.

Nominees and winners of the 13th Annual Lo Nuestro Awards (winners listed first).

Special awards
Excellence Award: Joan Sebastian.
Special Tribute ("Jóvenes con Legado"): Chayanne.
Internet Awards:
Pop: Azul Azul.
Tropical: Carlos Vives.
Regional/Mexican: Banda el Recodo.
Premio del Pueblo (Viewers Choice):
Pop: Thalía.
Tropical: Elvis Crespo.
Regional/Mexican: Pepe Aguilar.

See also
2000 in Latin music
2001 in Latin music
Latin Grammy Awards of 2000
Grammy Award for Best Latin Pop Album

References

2001 music awards
Lo Nuestro Awards by year
2001 in Florida
2001 in Latin music
2000s in Miami